Suzan Jane Crowley (born 1953) is an English-American actress, best known for her role as Maria Rossi in The Devil Inside.

Filmography

Film

Television

References

External links 
 
 
 

1953 births
Living people
20th-century American actresses
American film actresses
21st-century British actresses
20th-century British actresses
British film actresses
21st-century American women